Daniel Béland is a Canadian political sociologist, currently Director of the McGill Institute for the Study of Canada and James McGill Professor in the Department of Political Science at McGill University.

References

Canadian sociologists
Université du Québec à Montréal alumni
Canada Research Chairs
Living people
Year of birth missing (living people)
Place of birth missing (living people)
School for Advanced Studies in the Social Sciences alumni